Bror "Lulle" Pettersson (31 January 1924 – 15 October 1978) was a Swedish ice hockey and bandy player, who represented Hammarby IF in both sports. He won the silver medal with Sweden in the in 1947 World Championships.

Athletic career

Ice hockey
Born and raised in Stockholm, Pettersson started to play ice hockey with Hammarby IF at age 12. In 1941, he made his debut in their senior roster, competing in the top flight Svenska Serien.

Pettersson won three Swedish championships – in 1942, 1945 and 1951 – with Hammarby IF. In total, he played 183 games for the club and scored 75 goals, in 14 seasons until 1956.

He made 23 international appearances for the Swedish national team. He won a silver medal with Sweden in the 1947 World Championships and finished in fourth place at the 1948 Winter Olympics in St. Moritz.

Bandy
Like many other ice hockey players at the time, Pettersson also played bandy. He made his debut for Hammarby IF in 1943, playing two seasons for the side in Allsvenskan, before leaving at the end of 1947. He made a comeback in 1952, playing an other two seasons in the first tier, before definitely retiring in 1954.

Football
Pettersson also briefly played football, starting his career with local club IK Tellus. In 1946–47, he made eight appearances for Hammarby IF, making three appearances in Division 2, Sweden's second tier.

References

External links
 

1924 births
1978 deaths
Hammarby Fotboll players
Hammarby Hockey (1921–2008) players
Hammarby IF Bandy players
Ice hockey players at the 1948 Winter Olympics
Olympic ice hockey players of Sweden
Ice hockey people from Stockholm
Swedish ice hockey players
Swedish bandy players
Swedish footballers
Association football forwards